Dave's Picks Volume 19 is a three-CD live album by the rock band the Grateful Dead.  It contains the complete concert recorded on January 23, 1970, at the Honolulu Civic Auditorium in Honolulu, Hawaii.  It also includes bonus tracks recorded the following night at the same venue, keyboardist Tom Constanten's last show with the band.  It was produced as a limited edition of 16,500 copies, and was released on August 1, 2016.

Critical reception
In All About Jazz, Doug Colette wrote, "As [David Lemieux] implies ever so strongly in his account of the iconic band's metamorphosis, the Grateful Dead were never more versatile than at this point of their career, equally conversant in the respective approaches of the psychedelic warriors, genteel nouveau folkies and uproarious dance band."

Track listing
Disc 1
January 23, 1970:
"China Cat Sunflower" > (Jerry Garcia, Robert Hunter) – 4:35
"I Know You Rider" > (traditional, arranged by Grateful Dead) – 6:11
"Black Peter" (Garcia, Hunter) – 8:36
"The Yellow Dog Story" (Bob Weir) – 3:14
"Hard to Handle" (Otis Redding, Alvertis Isbell, Allen Jones) – 5:41
"Mama Tried" (Merle Haggard) – 3:10
"Casey Jones" (Garcia, Hunter) – 1:22
"Dire Wolf" (Garcia, Hunter) – 4:27
"Good Lovin'" (Rudy Clark, Arthur Resnick) – 10:00
"That's It for the Other One" – 21:57
"Cryptical Envelopment" (Garcia)
"Drums" (Mickey Hart, Bill Kreutzmann)
"The Other One" (Weir, Kreutzmann)
"Cryptical Envelopment" (Garcia)
Disc 2
"Dark Star" > (Garcia, Hart, Kreutzmann, Phil Lesh, Ron McKernan, Weir, Hunter) – 18:45
"St. Stephen" (Garcia, Lesh, Hunter) – 5:02
"Turn On Your Lovelight" (Joseph Scott, Deadric Malone) – 38:09
Disc 3
January 24, 1970:
"Cumberland Blues" (Garcia, Lesh, Hunter) – 5:37
"Cold Rain and Snow" (traditional, arranged by Grateful Dead) – 5:36
"Me and My Uncle" (John Phillips) – 3:32
"I'm a King Bee" (James Moore) – 6:25
"Mason's Children" (Garcia, Weir, Lesh, Hunter) – 6:47 
"Black Peter" (Garcia, Hunter) – 9:41
"Good Lovin'" (Clark, Resnick) – 6:23
"Feedback" > (Grateful Dead) – 1:23
"And We Bid You Goodnight" (traditional, arranged by Grateful Dead) – 4:25
"Dancing in the Street" (William "Mickey" Stevenson, Marvin Gaye, Ivy Jo Hunter) – 9:18

Notes

Personnel
Grateful Dead
Tom Constanten – keyboards
Jerry Garcia – guitar, vocals
Mickey Hart – drums
Bill Kreutzmann – drums
Phil Lesh – bass, vocals
Ron "Pigpen" McKernan – harmonica, percussion, vocals
Bob Weir – guitar, vocals
Production
Produced by Grateful Dead
Produced for release by David Lemieux
Associate Producers: Doran Tyson & Ivette Ramos
Recording: Owsley Stanley
Mastering: Jeffrey Norman
Art direction, design: Steve Vance
Cover art: Justin Helton
Photos: Stephen Siegel
Liner notes essay "Dead and Gone to Hawaii": David Lemieux

Charts

References

19
2016 live albums
Rhino Entertainment live albums